HMS Malacca was a 17-gun wooden sloop of the Royal Navy. She was ordered on 9 November 1847 from Moulmein, Burma to be built of teak. As a Surveyor's Department design, Malacca was based on the Conflict designed sloop which was approved on 9 December 1848. After launching in April 1853 she was commissioned the following month to be sailed to England for the fitting of her engine. She entered British Naval service in 1854 and served three commissions including action in the Russian War 1854 - 55 before being sold in 1869. Her resale to Japan, she served in the Japanese Navy as a training ship until broken in 1906.

Malacca was the second name vessel since it was used for a 36-gun fifth rate launched at Prince of Wales I, Penang in 1809 and broken in March 1816.

Construction and specifications
Malacca’s keel was laid in January 1849 at Moulmein, Burma and launched on 2 June 1851. Her builder’s measure tonnage was 1,034 tons. Her draught forward was  Nd  aft. During the construction of the hull, Mr Mould died and his estate was declared bankrupt. The government Inspector General, Mr Ladd took over the construction. After the launch, she was prepped for sea as a sailing vessel, loaded with enough teak to construct another similar vessel then departed for England under the command of Lieutenant John A.P. Price, RN on 16 May 1853. Upon her arrival at Chatham she was paid off on 28 September 1853.

Starting on 31 January 1854 to her undocking on 8 August, she had her machinery installed. Her initial machinery was supplied by John Penn & Sons. She shipped two fire-tube rectangular boilers. She carried three mast and a full rig sail plan.

Her initial armament for a 17-gun fit consisted of one 8-inch 65 hundredweight (cwt) muzzle loading shell gun on a pivot mount forward with sixteen 32-pounder 32 cwt muzzle loading smooth bore (MLSB) guns on broadside trucks.

Commissioned service

First commission
She was commissioned on 19 June 1854 under the command of Captain Arthur Farquhar, RN for Particular Service during the Russian War 1854 - 55. She first sailed for the Baltic, joining Sir Robert Napier's Fleet. She returned with the Fleet in September prior to the Winter freeze up of the Baltic. Upon her return she sailed for the Black Sea to join British Forces there. Upon the cessation of Hostilities she was sent to the North America and West Indies Station in November 1855. By January 1857 she had been reassigned to the Mediterranean. In January 1857, she rescued the survivors from the Royal Sicilian Navy ship , which suffered a boiler explosion and sank in the Mediterranean Sea with the loss of more than half of her 100 crew. She returned to Home Waters, paying off at Sheerness on 16 June 1857.

Second commission
She was commissioned at Sheerness on 3 September 1861 under the command of Captain Gerard J. Napier, RN for service in the Mediterranean. Most references stated that during this commission she was re-engined. Though plausible it is believed that she was either re-engined before this commission or following it (author's observation). During this commission she was reclassified as a corvette in 1862. On 14 October 1863, she ran aground at Fort St. Angelo, Malta but was not damaged. A Court of Enquiry found that her captain and her master had made an error of judgement. She paid off at Portsmouth on 8 December 1863.

Third commission
Her last commission was on 10 November 1865 under the command of Captain Radulphus B. Oldfield, RN for service on the Pacific Station. On 16 September 1867, she ran aground in the Lorenzo Channel. Repairs cost £1,371. An officer was found to have been negligent. She returned to Home Waters paying off on 9 September 1869.

Disposition
She was sold in June 1869 to E. Bates. Bates sold her later that year to the Imperial Japanese Navy, who took her into service as the Tsukuba. She served as a stationary training ship after about 1900, and was broken up in 1906.

Citations

References
 Lyon Winfield, The Sail & Steam Navy List, All the Ships of the Royal Navy 1815 to 1889, by David Lyon & Rif Winfield, published by Chatham Publishing, London © 2004, 
 The Navy List, published by His Majesty's Stationery Office, London
 Winfield, British Warships in the Age of Sail (1817 – 1863), by Rif Winfield, published by Seaforth Publishing, England © 2014, e, Chapter 12 Screw Sloops, Vessels ordered or reordered as steam screw sloops (from 1845), Malacca
 Colledge, Ships of the Royal Navy, by J.J. Colledge, revised and updated by Lt Cdr Ben Warlow and Steve Bush, published by Seaforth Publishing, Barnsley, Great Britain, © 2020, e  (EPUB), Section G (Grinder) Section M (Malacca)

1853 ships
Victorian-era corvettes of the United Kingdom
Victorian-era cruisers of the United Kingdom
Corvettes of the Royal Navy
Sloops of the Royal Navy
Maritime incidents in October 1863
Maritime incidents in September 1867
Screw sloops of the Imperial Japanese Navy